Brigitte Boehme (born 21 June 1940) is a German lawyer and church administrator.

Life
Born in Oldenburg, Boehme studied law in Marburg from 1959 to 1965, taking the first Staatsexamen in 1966, the second in 1970.

She grew up without contact with religion, but decided to become baptized in 1982. As president, she conducted the meetings of the synod of the Bremen Protestant Church. She was trained from 2004 to 2006 to be a lay preacher. She has served in that function in her parish, .

The motto of the 32nd Kirchentag was "Mensch, wo bist du?" (Man, where are you?) It was the first time that a biblical motto was a question. Boehme expressed the hope that the "new challenge" ("neue Herausforderung") of organizing the event, with support from  neighbour churches and the political and social forces of Bremen ("mit Unterstützung der Nachbarkirchen sowie der politischen und gesellschaftlichen Kräfte in unserem Zwei-Städte-Staat"), would result in a win of impulses and experiences, contacts and meetings ("Zugewinn an Impulsen und Erfahrungen, an Kontakten und Begegnungen"). From 2009 to 2014, Boehme was a member of the synod of the EKD (Protestant Church in Germany). She was a candidate for the highest office  of the synod, Präses, in 2013, received the highest number of votes, but not the needed majority.

References

External links 
 Brigitte Boehme, Renke Brahms: Bremisch evangelisch. Wieso „Bremisch evangelisch“? kirche-bremen.de

20th-century German judges
German women judges
1940 births
Living people
University of Marburg alumni
Clergy from Bremen
21st-century German judges
20th-century women judges
21st-century women judges